Qin Haiyang (born 17 May 1999) is a Chinese swimmer. He competed in the men's 200 metre breaststroke at the 2018 World Championships and won the silver medal.

Personal bests

Long course (50-meter pool)

Short course (25-meter pool)

Key: NR = National Record ; AS = Asian Record

References

External links
 

1999 births
Living people
Place of birth missing (living people)
Swimmers at the 2018 Asian Games
Asian Games medalists in swimming
Asian Games gold medalists for China
Asian Games bronze medalists for China
Medalists at the 2018 Asian Games
Chinese male breaststroke swimmers
Swimmers at the 2020 Summer Olympics
Olympic swimmers of China
Medalists at the FINA World Swimming Championships (25 m)
21st-century Chinese people